= Robert Sanford (American football) =

American football player (born 1979)

Profile
- Position: Running back

Personal information
- Born: April 17, 1979 (age 47); Miami, Florida, U.S.
- Listed height: 5 ft 10 in (1.78 m)
- Listed weight: 225 lb (102 kg)

Career information
- High school: Carol City (Miami Gardens, FL)
- College: Western Michigan (1997–2000)

Career history
- Frankfurt Galaxy (2002); Chicago Bears (2002)*; Saskatchewan Roughriders (2003)
- * Offseason or practice squad member only

Robert Sanford (April 17, 1979) is a former American football running back for the Western Michigan Broncos from 1997 to 2000. He grew up in Miami, Florida. At Western Michigan, he had three seasons in which he gained over 1,000 rushing yards, tallying 1,033 yards in 1997, 1,137 yards in 1999, and 1,571 yards in 2000. His 1,571 rushing yards in 2000 ranked fifth among major-college players. He won the Mid-American Conference player of the year award for 2000. Sanford finished his college career as Western Michigan's all-time leader with 4,219 rushing yards.

Sanford played for the Frankfurt Galaxy and Chicago Bears in 2002. He also played for the Saskatchewan Roughriders in 2003.

Sanford was named to the Western Michigan All-Century Team and inducted into the Western Michigan Athletics Hall of Fame in 2015.
